The 2017–18 Pacific Tigers women's basketball team represents the University of the Pacific during the 2017–18 NCAA Division I women's basketball season. The Tigers are led by third year head coach Bradley Davis. They play their home games at Alex G. Spanos Center and are members of the West Coast Conference. They finished the season 15–17, 7–11 in WCC play to finish in seventh place. They advanced to the semifinals of the WCC women's tournament where they lost to San Diego.

Previous season
They finished the season 10–21, 5–13 in WCC play to finish in a tie for eighth place. They advanced to the quarterfinals of the WCC women's tournament where they lost to Gonzaga.

Roster

Schedule 

|-
!colspan=9 style=| Exhibition

|-
!colspan=9 style=| Non-conference regular season

|-
!colspan=9 style=| WCC regular season

|-
!colspan=9 style=| WCC Women's Tournament

Rankings
2017–18 NCAA Division I women's basketball rankings

See also 
 2017–18 Pacific Tigers men's basketball team

References 

Pacific Tigers women's basketball seasons
Pacific
Pacific
Pacific